High Class White Trash is the debut solo studio album by American rapper Big B. It was released on January 20, 2004 via Suburban Noize Records.

CD track listing

References

2004 debut albums
Big B (rapper) albums
Suburban Noize Records albums